Feuilletine, or pailleté feuilletine, is a crispy confection made from thin, sweetened crêpes. The crêpe batter is baked for a few minutes, and the crêpes are allowed to cool; as they cool, they become crisp. In French, these crispy crêpes are called crêpes gavottes or crêpes dentelles; but when crumbled into small shards, they become feuilletine.

Feuilletine is decorative and has a buttery flavour, but it is especially valued for the unique texture it adds to dishes. It is sometimes incorporated into praline, hazelnut paste, and other nut pastes. Although feuilletine is produced commercially, it was originally conceived as a way for a pâtisserie to make use of cookie scraps.

See also

References

Further reading
 

French confectionery
Pâtisserie